Fozeyli or Fazili may refer to:
 Fazili, Fars
 Fozeyli, Khuzestan

See also
 Sheykh Fozeyli